In computer science, all-pairs testing or pairwise testing is a combinatorial method of software testing that, for each pair of input parameters to a system (typically, a software algorithm), tests all possible discrete combinations of those parameters. Using carefully chosen test vectors, this can be done much faster than an exhaustive search of all combinations of all parameters, by "parallelizing" the tests of parameter pairs.

Rationale 

The most common bugs in a program are generally triggered by either a single input parameter or an interaction between pairs of parameters.  Bugs involving interactions between three or more parameters are both progressively less common  and also progressively more expensive to find---such testing has as its limit the testing of all possible inputs. Thus, a combinatorial technique for picking test cases like all-pairs testing is a useful cost-benefit compromise that enables a significant reduction in the number of test cases without drastically compromising functional coverage.

More rigorously, if we assume that a test case has  parameters given in a set .
Let's assume that .
Imagining that the code deals with the conditions taking only two parameters at a time, might reduce the number of needed test cases.

To demonstrate, suppose there are X,Y,Z parameters.
We can use a predicate of the form  of order 3, which takes all 3 as input, or rather three different order 2 predicates of the form .  can be written in an equivalent form of  where comma denotes any combination. If the code is written as conditions taking "pairs" of parameters,
then the set of choices of ranges  can be a multiset, because there can be multiple parameters having same number of choices.

 is one of the maximum of the multiset 
The number of pair-wise test cases on this test function would be:-

N-wise testing 

N-wise testing can be considered the generalized form of pair-wise testing.

The idea is to apply sorting to the set   so that  gets ordered too.
Let the sorted set be a   tuple :-

Now we can take the set  and call it the pairwise testing.
Generalizing further we can take the set  and call it the 3-wise testing.
Eventually, we can say   T-wise testing.

The N-wise testing then would just be, all possible combinations from the above formula.

Example 

Consider the parameters shown in the table below.

'Enabled', 'Choice Type' and 'Category' have a choice range of 2, 3 and 4, respectively. An exhaustive test would involve 24 tests (2 x 3 x 4). Multiplying the two largest values (3 and 4) indicates that a pair-wise tests would involve 12 tests. The pairwise test cases, generated by Microsoft's "pict" tool, are shown below.

See also 

 Software testing
 Orthogonal array testing

Notes

External links 
 Pairwise testing
 Pairwise and generalized t-way combinatorial testing
 Pairwise Testing in the Real World: Practical Extensions to Test-Case Scenarios

Software testing
Combinatorics
Design of experiments